Long John’s Blues is an extended play 45 rpm record released in 1965 by Long John Baldry. It was released on United Artists/EMI Records as UEP 1013 in mono.  It did not chart.  All of the songs can also be found on Baldry's album, Long John's Blues.

Track listing
Side 1
 "Dimples" (John Lee Hooker)
 "I’m Your Hoochie Coochie Man" (Willie Dixon)

Side 2
 "My Babe" (Willie Dixon)
 "Times are Getting Tougher than Tough" (Jimmy Witherspoon)

Personnel
 Long John Baldrey -  vocals, guitar
 Ian Armit -  piano
 Jeff Bradford -  guitar and harmonica
 Cliff Barton - bass guitar
 Bill Law - drums

References

1965 EPs
EPs by British artists
Long John Baldry albums